Roger Francis Hamilton Maxwell  (born 21 March 1941) is a former New Zealand politician. He was an MP from 1984 to 1999, representing the National Party.

Early life
Maxwell was born in South Canterbury. He obtained his tertiary education at Lincoln College and at Massey University. From 1967, he owned a farm in the Taranaki region and studied rural valuation.

Political career

Maxwell was a member of the Ashburton branch of the Young Nats from 1963. He chaired the Urenui branch of the National Party from 1969, and was the Taranaki electorate chairman from 1977 to 1983.

He was first elected to Parliament in the 1984 election in Taranaki, when he succeeded Thomson.  When the National Party won power in the 1990 election, Maxwell became the Minister of Business Development, the Associate Minister of Employment, and the Associate Minister of Immigration. In 1993, he became the (full) Minister of Immigration.

In the 1996 election, the Taranaki electorate was merged with the King Country electorate, and the combined Taranaki-King Country electorate was taken by King Country MP (and Prime Minister) Jim Bolger; Maxwell instead contested the New Plymouth electorate, but was defeated by Labour's Harry Duynhoven. Maxwell remained in Parliament as a list MP, but lost his ministerial portfolios in the reshuffle made necessary by National's coalition with New Zealand First. He retired at the 1999 election.

Honours
In the 2004 Queen's Birthday Honours, Maxwell was appointed a Companion of the Queen's Service Order for public services.

References

New Zealand National Party MPs
Members of the Cabinet of New Zealand
1941 births
Living people
New Zealand list MPs
Members of the New Zealand House of Representatives
New Zealand MPs for North Island electorates
Lincoln University (New Zealand) alumni
Massey University alumni
Companions of the Queen's Service Order